= TF-19 Wasp =

TF-19 Wasp is a drone flamethrower attachment designed by Throwflame. It was designed for remote ignition for aerial and ground targets.

== Specifications ==
The attachment can work with drones which can carry weights of up to 5 pounds, and can reach a target 25 feet or 7 meters away. The duration of fire is up to 100 seconds with its gallon of fuel.
